Harry Fraser may refer to:

Harry W. Fraser (1884–1950), American railway labor leader
Harry Fraser (director) (1889–1974), American film director and screenplay writer

See also
Harold Fraser (disambiguation)
Henry Fraser (disambiguation)